The 2021–22 Niagara Purple Eagles men's ice hockey season was the 26th season of play for the program, the 24th at the Division I level, and the 12th season in the Atlantic Hockey conference. The Purple Eagles represented Niagara University and were coached by Jason Lammers, in his 5th season.

Season
Niagara didn't have much to celebrate during the season. For most of the year they were near the bottom of the conference standings and were among the worst in terms of both goals scored and goals allowed. However, the Eagles did show flashes of strong play and posted one of the program's best wins when they defeated #10 Notre Dame after Christmas.

In the final week of the regular season, the team managed to take down conference champion American International in a shootout. When they entered the postseason they were set against Bentley, who had gone winless in their previous eleven games. Unfortunately, Niagara dropped both games at home and saw their season come to an abrupt end.

Departures

Recruiting

Roster
As of September 6, 2021.

Standings

Schedule and results

|-
!colspan=12 style=";" | Regular Season

|-
!colspan=12 style=";" | 

|- align="center" bgcolor="#e0e0e0"
|colspan=12|Niagara Lost Series 0–2

Scoring statistics

Goaltending statistics

Rankings

Note: USCHO did not release a poll in week 24.

Awards and honors

References

2021–22
Niagara Purple Eagles
Niagara Purple Eagles
2021 in sports in New York (state)
2022 in sports in New York (state)